The Aba River is a river in southern Nigeria. It runs through the city of Aba, Nigeria. It is a tributary of the Imo River. Its headwaters are in Okpu-Umuobo in the Ngwa heartland into the Aba City.

References 

Rivers of Nigeria
Aba, Abia